Postumius Rufius Festus Avienius (sometimes erroneously Avienus) was a Latin writer of the 4th century AD. He was a native of Volsinii in Etruria, from the distinguished family of the Rufii Festi.

Avienius is not identical with the historian Festus.

Background
Avienius made somewhat inexact translations into Latin of Aratus' didactic poem Phaenomena. He also took a popular Greek poem in hexameters, Periegesis, briefly delimiting the habitable world from the perspective of Alexandria, written by Dionysius Periegetes in a terse and elegant style that was easy to memorize for students, and translated it into an archaising Latin as his Descriptio orbis terrae ("Description of the World's Lands"). Only Book I survives, with an unsteady grasp of actual geography and some far-fetched etymologies: see Ophiussa.

He wrote Ora Maritima, a poem claimed to contain borrowings from the 6th-century BC Massiliote Periplus. Avienius also served as governor of Achaia and Africa.

According to legend, when asked what he did in the country, he answered Prandeo, poto, cano, ludo, lavo, caeno, quiesco:

However this quote is a misattribution and likely comes from the works of Martial.

Editions
 A. Berthelot: . Paris 1934. (text of reference)

 J. P. Murphy:  or Description of the seacoast. (Chicago) 1977.
 J. Soubiran: . CUF, Paris 1981. (text of reference)
 D. Stichtenoth: . Darmstadt 1968. (the Latin text is that of the editio princeps of 1488 and is better not cited)
 P. van de Woestijne: . Brugge 1961. (text of reference)

Commentaries, monographs and articles
 F. Bellandi, E. Berti und M. Ciappi: . 96 - 139 e Avieno Arati Phaen. 273 - 352), Pisa 2001
 
 . Curavit Manfred WACHT. G. Olms Verlag 1995
 M. Fiedler: . Stuttgart Saur 2004
 C. Ihlemann: . Diss. Göttingen 1909
 H. Kühne: . Essen 1905
 K. Smolak: . In: 
 D. Weber: . Dissertationen der Universität Wien 173, Wien 1986
 L. Willms  AKAN-Einzelschriften – Antike Naturwissenschaften und ihre Rezeption, vol. 8. Trier WVT 2014 
 P. van de Woestijne: . 1959
 H. Zehnacker: . Illinois Classical Studies 44 (1989), S. 317-329

References

Further reading
Alan Cameron, "Macrobius, Avienus, and Avianus" The Classical Quarterly New Series, 17.2 (November 1967), pp 385–399.

External links

Ortelius' bibliography: notes of cartographers
Ora maritima and Periegesis in Latin, at The Latin Library
Introduction and e-text of the "Description" (in French)
English translation of Ora maritima by Ralph Morley (2018) in ToposText.org.

4th-century Latin writers
4th-century Roman poets
4th-century translators
Late-Roman-era pagans
Postumii
Roman governors of Achaia
Roman governors of Africa
Rufii
Year of birth missing
Year of death missing